The 1962 NCAA Swimming and Diving Championships were contested in March 1962 at the Ohio State Natatorium at the Ohio State University in Columbus, Ohio at the 26th annual officially NCAA-sanctioned swim meet to determine the team and individual national champions of men's collegiate swimming and diving in the United States. Including the championships held before NCAA sponsorship in 1937, this was the 39th overall American collegiate championship.

Hosts Ohio State topped the team standings, finishing forty-six points ahead of USC, and claimed their eleventh national title. As of 2016, this was the last championship won by the Buckeyes.

Team standings
Note: Top 10 only
(H) = Hosts
Full results

See also
List of college swimming and diving teams

References

NCAA Division I Men's Swimming and Diving Championships
NCAA Swimming And Diving Championships
NCAA Swimming And Diving Championships
NCAA Swimming And Diving Championships